Karai Kadipur massacre was the massacre of unarmed Hindu villagers of Joypurhat on 26 April 1971 by the Pakistani army and the Razakars. 370 Hindus were killed in the massacre in the villages of Karai, Kadipur and other adjoining villages.

Background 
In 1971, the twin villages of Karai and Kadipur were under Joypurhat sub-division of Rajshahi district, now under Bambu Union of Joypurhat Sadar Upazila in Joypurhat district bordering India. The two villages were predominantly Hindu inhabited mostly by the people from Kumbhakar caste.

Events 
On the night of 24 April, the Pakistani army arrived from Santahar by train and entered the sub-divisional town of Joypurhat. From the morning of 25 April, the Pakistani army began killing of the civilians and engaged in loot and arson. The people of Joypurhat began to flee to the country side. On 26 April, the army aided by the collaborators targeted the Hindu dominated villages of Karai and Kadipur. They encircled the villages and took the Hindu men in their captivity. The men were made to stand in a line and burst fired using light machine guns.

Memorial 
No memorial has been built so far in the memory of the victims. The Bangladesh government had acquired three decimals of land to build a memorial in the late nineties, however the memorial is yet to be built.

List of persons killed 
No initiative from the government has been taken so far in preparing a comprehensive list of the victims of the massacre. The partial list includes the following names.

 Dr. Krishna Chandra Barman
 Gopinath Pal
 Bhupen Pal
 Kshitish Chandra Pal
 Chhedra Barman
 Mahindra Chandra Barman
 Tarmuja Barman
 Subal Chandra Barman
 Ashwini Chandra Pal
 Jatish Pal
 Kancha Pal
 Mahabharat Pal
 Girish Chandra
 Rajen Chandra

References 

Massacres of men
Violence against men in Asia
Massacres in 1971
1971 in Bangladesh
1971 Bangladesh genocide
Massacres of Bengali Hindus in East Pakistan
Massacres committed by Pakistan in East Pakistan
Persecution of Hindus
Persecution by Muslims
April 1971 events in Bangladesh